Douglas Chester Wozniak (born January 17, 1947) is a Republican American politician. He is a member of the Michigan Senate from the 8th district, after winning a 2021 special election. He was previously a member of the Michigan House of Representatives and has represented the 36th district between 2019 and 2021.

In 2022, Wozniak chose to return to the House rather than run for another term in the Senate to avoid facing fellow incumbent Senator Ruth Johnson in a primary, after the two were drawn into the same district in the redistricting process. In November 2022, Wozniak ran and successfully won election to the new 59th House District. His term will begin Jan. 1, 2023.

References

External links 
 Doug Wozniak at gophouse.org
 Doug Wozniak at ballotpedia.org
 Doug Wozniak at votesmart.org

Living people
1947 births
People from Hamtramck, Michigan
University of Michigan alumni
Michigan State University alumni
Republican Party members of the Michigan House of Representatives
21st-century American politicians
21st-century American lawyers